Crewman is a generic term for a crew member serving in the operation of an aircraft, naval vessel, or train.  The term may also refer to individuals serving in a military capacity on weapon system platforms, such as those operating a tank.

In some science fiction (most notably Star Trek), crewman is the lowest military rank on board a spacecraft, analogous to seaman in many real-world navies.

The term "crewman" may also be used interchangeably with the non-gender specific form as "crewperson" or 
"crewmember".

Notes

References

Military ranks